Sylvi Keskinen Weintraub (8 July 1933 – 4 May 2013) was a Finnish hurdler. She competed in the women's 80 metres hurdles at the 1952 Summer Olympics. She worked as a X-ray nurse.

References

External links
 

1933 births
2013 deaths
People from Ylöjärvi
Athletes (track and field) at the 1952 Summer Olympics
Finnish female hurdlers
Olympic athletes of Finland
Sportspeople from Pirkanmaa